Eve's Love Letters is a 1927 American silent comedy film featuring Stan Laurel.

Cast
 Agnes Ayres as The wife
 Forrest Stanley as Adam, her husband
 Stan Laurel as Anatole, the butler
 Jerry Mandy as Mr. X aka Sir Oliver Hardy
 Fred Malatesta as Mr. X's Accomplice (uncredited)

See also
 List of American films of 1927
 Stan Laurel filmography

References

External links

1927 films
American silent short films
American black-and-white films
1927 comedy films
1927 short films
Silent American comedy films
American comedy short films
1920s American films